Beyond Love (Italian: Oltre l'amore) is a 1940 Italian historical drama film directed by Carmine Gallone and starring Alida Valli, Amedeo Nazzari and Osvaldo Valenti. It is based on the 1829 novella Vanina Vanini by Stendhal.

It was shot at Cinecittà Studios in Rome. The film's sets were designed by the art directors Guido Fiorini and Ivo Battelli.

Plot

Cast
 Alida Valli as Vanina Vanini 
 Amedeo Nazzari as Pietro Mirilli 
 Camillo Pilotto as Il duca Vanini 
 Osvaldo Valenti as Livio Sabelli 
 Germaine Aussey as Maria Talleschi 
 Lamberto Picasso as Meschiori 
 Lauro Gazzolo as Il conte Sabelli-Catanzaro, ministro di polizia 
 Amina Pirani Maggi as Elisa 
 Carlo Bressan as Santucci 
 Emilio Cigoli as Ippoliti 
 Romolo Costa as Un carbonaro
 Claudio Ermelli as Una Spia
 Oreste Fares as Padre Notari
 Augusto Marcacci as Il segretario del ministro di polizia

References

Bibliography 
 Nowell-Smith, Geoffrey. The Companion to Italian Cinema. Cassell, 1996.

External links 
 

1940 films
1940s historical comedy films
Italian historical comedy films
1940s Italian-language films
Films directed by Carmine Gallone
Films shot at Cinecittà Studios
Films set in the 19th century
Films scored by Alessandro Cicognini
Films based on works by Stendhal
1940s Italian films